The Ford Discovery Centre was an interactive automobile museum located in Geelong, Victoria, Australia. It was operated by Ford Heritage Ltd, a Not for Profit Trust set up to showcase and preserve the heritage of the Ford Motor Company in Australia.

The museum, which extended over two floors, featured various Ford vehicles, a theatre and some car-related games and activities. It was opened to the public by Jeff Kennett in April 1999. Around 20,000 visitors a year attended the centre.

See also
List of automobile museums

References

External links
Official Website (Archived)
Green Country Offroad Site

Automobile museums in Australia
Buildings and structures in Geelong
Museums established in 1999
Museums in Victoria (Australia)
Discovery Centre
Tourist attractions in Geelong
1999 establishments in Australia
2012 disestablishments in Australia